John Hayward (1807–1891) was a Gothic Revival architect based in Exeter, Devon, who gained the reputation as "the senior architect in the west of England".

Biography 
John Hayward was born in London on 26 September 1807, the son of a 'house and ornament painter', John Pearson Hayward and Frances Barry and related to Sir Charles Barry, the designer of the Palace of Westminster, with whom he served as pupil.

He was an accomplished painter and draughtsman; by 1826, he was exhibiting at the Royal Academy and, by 1834, he had left Barry and set up practice in Cathedral Yard, Exeter, Devon.

Hayward was official architect of The Exeter Diocesan Architectural Society, which meant that all new designs for the churches in the Exeter Diocese passed through him for approval, and a member of Cambridge Camden Society, later The Ecclesiological Society.

So popular was his work on local churches that St Andrew's, Exwick was described by The Ecclesiologist in July 1842, as the "best specimen of modern church we have yet seen."

This accolade soon led to further work; in Scotland, Lady Cecil Chetwynd-Talbot, the Marchioness of Lothian, commissioned Hayward to design St John's Church, Jedburgh in 1844, and in Oxfordshire he designed St. James' Church in Little Milton, Oxfordshire, to which he added the west tower in 1861.

But probably his most famous design was for The Royal Albert Memorial Museum, Exeter. which opened in 1868 as a practical memorial to Prince Albert, and is the largest museum in the city.

Whilst many of his designs were for religious use, he also designed schools and worked on other buildings, including The Hall, Pembroke College, Oxford, (1844) which Nikolaus Pevsner described as "the most ambitious of all halls except Wolsey's" at Christ Church College, and Exeter Prison on New North Road, Exeter, which was based upon the plans of the new model prison at Pentonville.

Hayward died on 7 May 1891. His son, Pearson Barry Hayward, worked under him, but died before his father in 1888; their practice was known as Messrs Hayward & Son.

Work 
Work, including restoration, undertaken by John Hayward and his practice includes:

In Cornwall 

All Saints, Herodsfoot
All Saints, Tuckingmill, Camborne
Holy Trinity, Carnmenellis
St Cleder, St Clether

In Devon 

St Andrew, Exwick
St Mary, Bickleigh
St Mary, Bicton
St Michael, Sowton
St Mark, Dawlish
St David, Exeter
St Mary Arches, Exeter
St Andrew, Halberton
St Gregory, Harpford
St John the Baptist, Holcombe Burnell
St Thomas of Canterbury, Kingswear
St Mary Magdalene, Monkton
St Michael, Mumsbury
St Michael, Beer
St Mary, Appledore, Northam
St Mary, Rockbeare
St Mary, Whimple
St Mary the Virgin, Woolfardisworthy, Mid Devon
St Swithun, Sandford
St Peter, Uplowman
St Thomas the Apostle, Exeter
St John The Evangelist, Tipton St John
Holy Trinity, Ilfracombe
St Philip and St James, Ilfracombe
Paschoe House, Crediton
All Saints, Okehampton
St Bridget, Bridestowe
Holy Trinity, Buckfastleigh
Holy Trinity, Burrington
St Eustachius' Church, Tavistock 
St Peter, Twitchen
St Mary, Uffculme
Crediton Parish Church
St Michael and All Angels, Alphington
St Luke's College, Exeter University
The Exeter Diocesan Training School, now part of St. Luke's Campus
All Hallows on the Wall, Exeter (since demolished)
Queen Elizabeth School, Crediton
Hele's School, Exeter
The New Buildings, Blundell's School, Tiverton
Blundell's School chapel, Tiverton
The High School for Girls, Exeter. Renamed in 1912 as The Maynard School.
All Saints chapel, Bradfield, Uffculme
The Board School, Dawlish
Holcombe Court, Holcombe Rogus
The Halford Wing, Royal Devon & Exeter Hospital, Southernhay, Exeter, Devon
Ashbury House, Ashbury, Devon (since demolished).

In Jersey 

St Mark, Saint Helier
St Luke, Saint Saviour
St George, Saint Ouen
St Ouen, St Ouen
Victoria College, St Helier
Natwest Bank, Library Place, St Helier

Elsewhere 

St Michael, Milverton, Somerset
St Peter, Walgrave, Northamptonshire
St James, Little Milton, Oxfordshire
St. John, Jedburgh, Scottish Borders
The Hall, Pembroke College, Oxford
The New Buildings of 1846 (since renamed the Robert Stevens building), Pembroke College, Oxford

Gallery

See also 

 List of British architects

References

Further reading 
 pub2.exeter.gov.uk
 books.google.co.uk

1808 births
1891 deaths
Gothic Revival architects
English ecclesiastical architects
Architects from Exeter
19th-century English architects